Rochefourchat is a commune in the Drôme department, in the Auvergne-Rhône-Alpes region, southeastern France. In the commune there is a single house, the St. Pierre's Church, a converted barn, and the ruins of an old castle. The commune is bordered by four other communes, and nearest to Rochefourchat are Saint-Nazaire-le-Désert, Les Tonils, Pradelle, and Brette.

History
In 1178, the castle of Rocha Forcha was built by the bishops of Die as a stronghold against the Holy Roman Emperors. It belonged to French lords until the year 1766 when the last one, Lord Rey de Noinville, died. In 1796, a French trader, Pierre Jossaud bought the land surrounding the castle and renamed it Rochefourchat. The commune has been passed down through Jossaud's family.

Population

The permanent population of Rochefourchat consists of one woman; yet Rochefourchat is not the least populous French commune, as there are six communes with no inhabitants, destroyed and abandoned during World War I but maintained as administrative subdivisions to preserve their memory.

See also
Communes of the Drôme department

References

Communes of Drôme